Cheekpiece, cheek-piece, or cheek piece may refer to
A raised area on a rifle stock to support the cheek
A part of a bit for horses, e.g. the bit shank
A part of body armor such as the armet